The 1974 Northern Colorado Bears baseball team represented the University of Northern Colorado in the 1974 NCAA Division I baseball season. The Bears played their home games at Jackson Field. The team was coached by Tom Petroff in his 5th year at Colorado State.

The Bears won the District VII playoff to advanced to the College World Series, where they were defeated by the Southern Illinois Salukis.

Roster

Schedule 

! style="" | Regular Season
|- valign="top" 

|- align="center" bgcolor="#ffcccc"
| 1 || March  || at  || Unknown • El Paso, Texas || 0–11 || 0–1 || –
|- align="center" bgcolor="#ccffcc"
| 2 || March  || at UTEP || Unknown • El Paso, Texas || 16–7 || 1–1 || –
|- align="center" bgcolor="#ffcccc"
| 3 || March  || at  || Unknown • Flagstaff, Arizona || 2–11 || 1–2 || –
|- align="center" bgcolor="#ccffcc"
| 4 || March  ||  || Unknown • Unknown || 5–4 || 2–2 || –
|- align="center" bgcolor="#ccffcc"
| 5 || March  ||  || Unknown • Unknown || 4–3 || 3–2 || –
|- align="center" bgcolor="#ccffcc"
| 6 || March  ||  || Unknown • Unknown || 11–1 || 4–2 || –
|- align="center" bgcolor="#ccffcc"
| 7 || March  || Metro State || Unknown • Unknown || 14–4 || 5–2 || –
|- align="center" bgcolor="#ffcccc"
| 8 || March  ||  || Unknown • Unknown || 4–6 || 5–3 || –
|- align="center" bgcolor="#ffcccc"
| 9 || March  || Colorado State || Unknown • Unknown || 3–6 || 5–4 || –
|- align="center" bgcolor="#ffcccc"
| 10 || March  || Colorado State || Unknown • Unknown || 12–13 || 5–5 || –
|- align="center" bgcolor="#ccffcc"
| 11 || March  ||  || Unknown • Unknown || 11–2 || 6–5 || –
|- align="center" bgcolor="#ccffcc"
| 12 || March  || Regis || Unknown • Unknown || 8–0 || 7–5 || –
|- align="center" bgcolor="#ccffcc"
| 13 || March  ||  || Unknown • Unknown || 8–4 || 8–5 || –
|-

|- align="center" bgcolor="#ccffcc"
| 14 || April 3 ||  || Jackson Field • Greeley, Colorado || 6–5 || 9–5 || –
|- align="center" bgcolor="#ffcccc"
| 15 || April 3 || Air Force || Jackson Field • Greeley, Colorado || 1–3 || 9–6 || –
|- align="center" bgcolor="#ccffcc"
| 16 || April  || Wyoming || Unknown • Unknown || 7–4 || 10–6 || –
|- align="center" bgcolor="#ffcccc"
| 17 || April  || Wyoming || Unknown • Unknown || 4–5 || 10–7 || –
|- align="center" bgcolor="#ccffcc"
| 18 || April  || Denver || Unknown • Unknown || 6–0 || 11–7 || –
|- align="center" bgcolor="#ffcccc"
| 19 || April  ||  || Unknown • Unknown || 12–13 || 11–8 || 0–1
|- align="center" bgcolor="#ccffcc"
| 20 || April  || Regis || Unknown • Unknown || 4–2 || 12–8 || 0–1
|- align="center" bgcolor="#ccffcc"
| 21 || April  || Regis || Unknown • Unknown || 15–0 || 13–8 || 0–1
|- align="center" bgcolor="#ffcccc"
| 22 || April  || Denver || Unknown • Unknown || 8–10 || 13–9 || 0–1
|- align="center" bgcolor="#ccffcc"
| 23 || April  ||  || Unknown • Unknown || 18–0 || 14–9 || 0–1
|- align="center" bgcolor="#ffcccc"
| 24 || April  || Western State || Unknown • Unknown || 3–4 || 14–10 || 0–1
|- align="center" bgcolor="#ccffcc"
| 25 || April  ||  || Unknown • Unknown || 18–1 || 15–10 || 0–1
|- align="center" bgcolor="#ccffcc"
| 26 || April  || Colorado College || Unknown • Unknown || 9–0 || 16–10 || 0–1
|- align="center" bgcolor="#ccffcc"
| 27 || April 23 || at Air Force || Falcon Baseball Field • Colorado Springs, Colorado || 7–6 || 17–10 || 0–1
|- align="center" bgcolor="#ccffcc"
| 28 || April  || Metro State || Unknown • Unknown || 15–2 || 18–10 || 0–1
|-

|- align="center" bgcolor="#ccffcc"
| 29 || May || Southern Colorado State || Unknown • Unknown || 8–1 || 19–10 || 1–1
|- align="center" bgcolor="#ccffcc"
| 30 || May || Southern Colorado State || Unknown • Unknown || 9–5 || 20–10 || 2–1
|- align="center" bgcolor="#ccffcc"
| 31 || May || Southern Colorado State || Unknown • Unknown || 11–9 || 21–10 || 3–1
|- align="center" bgcolor="#ccffcc"
| 32 || May  ||  ||  Unknown • Unknown || 3–2 || 22–10 || 4–1
|- align="center" bgcolor="#ccffcc"
| 33 || May  || Emporia State || Unknown • Unknown || 4–1 || 23–10 || 5–1
|- align="center" bgcolor="#ccffcc"
| 34 || May  || Wyoming || Unknown • Unknown || 9–7 || 24–10 || 5–1
|- align="center" bgcolor="#ccffcc"
| 35 || May  || Wyoming || Unknown • Unknown || 11–3 || 25–10 || 5–1
|- align="center" bgcolor="#ccffcc"
| 36 || May  ||  || Unknown • Unknown || 9–3 || 26–10 || 5–1
|- align="center" bgcolor="#ccffcc"
| 37 || May  || Western State || Unknown • Unknown || 5–2 || 27–10 || 5–1
|-

|-
! style="" | Postseason
|- valign="top"

|- align="center" bgcolor="#ccffcc"
| 38 || May  ||  || Jackson Field • Greeley, Colorado || 6–3 || 28–10 || 4–0
|- align="center" bgcolor="#ffcccc"
| 39 || May  || Gonzaga || Jackson Field • Greeley, Colorado || 0–12 || 28–11 || 4–0
|- align="center" bgcolor="#ccffcc"
| 40 || May  || Gonzaga || Jackson Field • Greeley, Colorado || 6–2 || 29–11 || 4–0
|- align="center" bgcolor="#ccffcc"
| 41 || May 31 ||  || Jackson Field • Greeley, Colorado || 6–5 || 30–11 || 4–0
|- align="center" bgcolor="#ccffcc"
| 42 || June 1 || Arizona || Jackson Field • Greeley, Colorado || 6–2 || 31–11 || 4–0
|-

|- align="center" bgcolor="#ffcccc"
| 43 || June 7 || vs  || Johnny Rosenblatt Stadium • Omaha, Nebraska || 1–10 || 31–12 || 4–0
|- align="center" bgcolor="#ccffcc"
| 44 || June 8 || vs  || Johnny Rosenblatt Stadium • Omaha, Nebraska || 4–2 || 32–12 || 4–0
|- align="center" bgcolor="#ffcccc"
| 45 || June 11 || vs  || Johnny Rosenblatt Stadium • Omaha, Nebraska || 3–5 || 32–13 || 4–0
|-

Awards and honors 
Bob DeMeo
 All-Great Plains Athletic Conference Team
 Third Team All-American American Baseball Coaches Association

Ron Holmes
 All-Great Plains Athletic Conference Team

Denny Leonida
 All-Great Plains Athletic Conference Team

References 

Northern Colorado Bears baseball seasons
Northern Colorado Bears baseball
College World Series seasons
Northern Colorado
Great Plains Athletic Conference (1972–1976) baseball champion seasons